Either Or And is an album by British jazz saxophonist Evan Parker and Swiss pianist Sylvie Courvoisier, which was recorded in studio after their 2013 performance at The Stone and released on Relative Pitch Records.

Reception

The Down Beat review by Alain Drouot states "Even though the duo can get confrontational, they also know how to turn their dueling into fun and communicate the pleasure they take in playing with each other."

Track listing
All compositions by Parker/Courvoisier
 "If/Or"  – 7:02
 "Oare"  – 9:09
 "Spandrei"  – 8:05
 "Stillwell"  – 8:31
 "Stonewall"  – 10:15
 "Penumbra"  – 4:26
 "Heights"  – 4:59
 "Either Or And"  – 6:27

Personnel
Evan Parker – soprano sax, tenor sax
Sylvie Courvoisier – piano

References

2014 albums
Evan Parker albums
Sylvie Courvoisier albums